The goldbar wrasse (Thalassoma hebraicum) is a species of wrasse native to the western Indian Ocean, where it inhabits reef environments at depths from . It is a target of local traditional fisheries and can also be found in the aquarium trade.

References

External links
 

Goldbar wrasse
Fish described in 1801